Hudson is an English surname. Notable people and characters with the surname include:

A
Andrew Hudson (born 1965), South African test cricketer
Austin Hudson, 1st Baronet (1897–1956), British Conservative politician

B
Ben Hudson (born 1979), Australian AFL player
Bill Hudson (disambiguation), several people
Brett Hudson (born 1953), American musician, singer, and songwriter, one of the Hudson Brothers

C
Charles Hudson (disambiguation), several people
Chase Hudson, American TikTok star and social media influencer known professionally as Lil Huddy
Christie Brinkley (born Christie Hudson, Brinkley is adopted name)

D
Dakota Hudson (born 1994), American baseball player
Daniel Hudson (born 1987), American baseball player
Dave Hudson (born 1974), American artist, musician, boxer and wrestler
David Hudson (musician) (born 1962), Australian Aboriginal musician
David Hudson (pioneer) (1761–1836), American businessman, founder of Hudson, Ohio
Dawn Hudson (born c. 1957), American actress and movie executive, CEO of the Academy of Motion Picture Arts and Sciences
Donna Hudson (born 1946), American biomedical engineer

E
Erasmus Darwin Hudson (1805–1880), American surgeon
Erasmus Darwin Hudson Jr. (1843–1887), American physician, son of the above
Erlund Hudson (1912–2011), British artist
Ernie Hudson (born 1945), American actor and playwright

F
Fernando Tobias de Carvalho (born 1986), Brazilian footballer commonly known as Hudson
Francisco Hudson (1826–1859), Chilean navy officer and hydrographer

G
Garth Hudson (born 1937), Canadian musician
George Hudson (1800–1871), English railway financier
George Vernon Hudson (1867–1946), New Zealand entomologist
Grant M. Hudson (1868–1955), U.S. Representative from Michigan

H
Henry Hudson (d. 1611), English sea explorer and navigator
Henry Hudson (artist) (born 1982), British artist
Henry E. Hudson (born 1947), United States district court judge for the Eastern District of Virginia
Henry Louis Hudson (1898–1975), Canadian ice hockey player
Henry Philerin Hudson (1798–1889), Irish music collector
Hilda Phoebe Hudson (1881–1965), English mathematician
Hosea Hudson (1898–1988), African-American labor leader and civil rights activist
Hugh Hudson (1937–2023), English film director

J
Jackie Hudson (1934–2011), American anti-nuclear proliferation and peace activist
Jalen Hudson (born 1996), American basketball player in the Israeli Basketball Premier League
James Hudson (disambiguation), multiple people
Jeffrey Hudson (1619–1682), English dwarf in the court of Queen Henrietta Maria of England
Jennifer Hudson (born 1981), American singer and actress
Joe Hudson (disambiguation), several people
John Hudson (disambiguation), several people
Joseph Hudson (disambiguation), several people

K
Karl Hudson-Phillips (1933–2014), Trinidadian lawyer, judge of the International Criminal Court
Kate Hudson (born 1979), American actress
Kate Hudson (activist) (born 1958), British academic and political activist
Katheryn Hudson (Katy Perry) (born 1984), American singer
Kathryn Hudson (born 1949), British civil servant and Parliamentary Commissioner for Standards
Kerry Hudson (born 1980), Scottish writer
Khaleke Hudson (born 1997), American football player
Kirk Hudson (born 1986), English footballer
Kyle Hudson (born 1987), American baseball player and coach

L
Lucy-Jo Hudson (born 1983), English actress

M
Manley Ottmer Hudson (1886–1960), American professor of international law, editor of the American Journal of International Law and judge on the Permanent Court of International Justice.
Mark Hudson (footballer born 1980), English footballer currently with West Auckland Town AFC
Mark Hudson (footballer born 1982), English footballer currently with Cardiff City
Mark Hudson (musician) (born 1951), American record producer, musician, and songwriter, one of the Hudson Brothers
Maurice Hudson (born 1930), English footballer
Michael Hudson (disambiguation), several people
Murray Ken Hudson (1938–1974), New Zealand soldier awarded the George Cross

N
Newt Hudson (1926–2014), American politician
Noel Hudson (1893–1970), Anglican bishop
Norman Hudson (born 1945), English publisher and advisor on historic houses

O
Ola Hudson (1946–2009), American fashion designer and costumier
Oliver Hudson (born 1976), American actor
Orlando Hudson (born 1977), American baseball player

P
Paul Hudson (Australian rules footballer) (born 1970), Australian Rules Football player
Peter Hudson (born 1946), Australian Rules football player

R
Ralph Hudson, American murderer, in 1963 the last man to be executed in the State of New Jersey
Ray Hudson (born 1955), English former football player and coach
Richard Hudson (disambiguation), several people
Robert Hudson, 1st Viscount Hudson (1886–1957), British politician
Robert Hudson (broadcaster) (1920–2010), British broadcaster on cricket, rugby and state occasions
Robert George Spencer Hudson (1895–1965), British geologist and palaeontologist
Robert H. Hudson (born 1938), American artist
Robert Spear Hudson (1812–1884), British businessman who popularized dry soap powder
Robert William Hudson, (1856–1937), his son, soap manufacturer
Robin E. Hudson (born 1952), American judge, North Carolina Court of Appeals
Rock Hudson (1925–1985), American actor
Roger Hudson (cricketer) (born 1967), English cricketer
Roger Hudson (sailor) (born 1978), South African sailor
Ryan Hudson (born 1979), British rugby player

S
Sarah Hudson (singer) (born 1984), American singer-songwriter
Saul Hudson (born 1965), English-American rock guitarist known as Slash, lead guitarist of the American band Guns N' Roses
Scott Hudson (disambiguation), several people

T
Tanner Hudson (born 1994), American football player
Terry Hudson (rugby league), English rugby league footballer of the 1960s, 1970s and 1980s
Thomas Hudson (disambiguation), several people, including Tom Hudson
Tim Hudson (1940–2019) (aka 'Lord' Tim Hudson), DJ, rock band manager, cricket manager, artist
Tim Hudson (born 1975), MLB pitcher
Tommy Hudson (born 1997), American football player
Troy Hudson (born 1976), former NBA player

W
Will Hudson (born 1989), American basketball player
Will Hudson (songwriter) (1908–1981), Canadian-born American songwriter
William Hudson (engineer) (1896–1978), New Zealand-born Australian engineer of the Snowy Mountains Scheme
William Henry Hudson (1841–1922), Argentine-British author, naturalist, and ornithologist
William Hudson (botanist) (1730–1793), British botanist and apothecary
William L. Hudson (1794–1862), United States Navy officer in the  19th century
William Parker Hudson (1841–1894), Canadian businessman and politician
Winnifred Hudson (1905–1996), British-born painter who lived most of her life in Hawaii

Fictional characters 
Angus Hudson, in the television series Upstairs Downstairs
Baby Jane Hudson, in the novel and film What Ever Happened to Baby Jane?
Finn Hudson, from the television musical comedy-drama series Glee

References

English-language surnames
Patronymic surnames